This was the final year of the Soviet Union, and thus the end of the Cold War competition between the two space superpowers. The number of launches subsequently declined in the 1990s, and 2018 was the first year since 1990 to have more than 100 orbital launches.

Deep Space Rendezvous in 1991

EVAs

References

Footnotes 

 
Spaceflight by year